Fabrizio Santino (born 12 December 1982) is a British actor, known for portraying the role of Ziggy Roscoe in the Channel 4 soap opera, Hollyoaks, between 2013 and 2015. In 2023, Santino appeared in the BBC soap opera, EastEnders, as Brett Nelson.

Filmography

References

External links
 

1982 births
Living people
21st-century British male actors
British male soap opera actors